Alexander Bass (Hebrew: אלכסנדר בס) is an Israeli badminton player. In 2014, he became the men's doubles runner-up of the Hatzor International tournament, then in 2015 he became the champion. At the 2022 Maccabiah Games, he won a silver medal in men's doubles.

Achievements

BWF International Challenge/Series 
Men's doubles

  BWF International Challenge tournament
  BWF International Series tournament
  BWF Future Series tournament

References

External links 
 
 

Year of birth missing (living people)
Place of birth missing (living people)
Living people
Israeli male badminton players
Maccabiah Games gold medalists for Israel
Competitors at the 2013 Maccabiah Games
Competitors at the 2017 Maccabiah Games
Competitors at the 2022 Maccabiah Games
Maccabiah Games silver medalists for Israel
Maccabiah Games bronze medalists for Israel
Maccabiah Games medalists in badminton